Miyagiken Gokoku Shrine (宮城縣護國神社, Miyagiken gokoku jinja) is a Shinto shrine located in Sendai, Miyagi Prefecture, Japan. It enshrines the kami of "martyrs of the state" (国事殉難者) and its annual festivals take place on April 30, May 1, and October 23. It was established in 1904 and originally referred to as Shōkonsha (招魂社). Its current name dates to 1939.

Beppyo shrines

See also
List of Shinto shrines in Japan

External links
Official website

Shinto shrines in Miyagi Prefecture
Gokoku shrines